This list of botanical gardens and arboretums in New York is intended to include all significant botanical gardens and arboretums in the U.S. state of New York.

See also
List of botanical gardens and arboretums in the United States
Trees of New York City

References 

 
 
Tourist attractions in New York (state)
botanical gardens and arboretums in New York
Environment of New York City
Trees of New York City